Luca Vitali (born May 9, 1986) is an Italian professional basketball player for Pallacanestro Cantù of the Italian Serie A2.

He's a versatile player who can play as a point guard, shooting guard or small forward, defending on nearly any opponent thanks to his height and wingspan.

Professional career
Progressing through the youth ranks of home town club Virtus Bologna he unusually made his debut for the team in Europe's premier competition, the Euroleague, playing a few minutes in 2003.

He would make his first division debut the next year after moving to Montepaschi Siena, then the strongest side in Italy.

After playing little part in their championship winning season he dropped down a division to join LegaDue club Sutor Montegranaro. 
This proved to be a fruitful move for both sides, he became a starter, helped promote the club to the first division in 2006 and then on to the playoffs, his good performances even led to a call up to the league All star game.

In 2008 he was recruited by ambitious club Armani Jeans Milano with which he rediscovered the Euroleague, he was instrumental in the progress of Milano to the Top 16, scoring a team European record 32 points against Panionios to finish third in their group.  
However Vitali's time at Armani Jeans ended on a sour note when the club cancelled the last 2 years of his contract, he then joined rivals Lottomatica Roma.

After two years in Rome followed by a brief return to former youth side Virtus Bologna he joined Vanoli Cremona.
There he flourished, becoming an undisputed starter for the team and having career best figures in nearly all areas, helping his team escape relegation.

Wanting to play for a stronger side he joined ambitious Umana Venezia, there he had a mixed season, his talent obvious but his play not always consistent. This brought him to return to the club where he had the most personal success, Cremona, where he was appointed captain.

On May 18, 2015, Vitali signed with Herbalife Gran Canaria until the end of the 2014–15 ACB season. In July 2015, he returned to Vanoli Cremona.

On April 2, 2022, he has signed with Pallacanestro Cantù of the Italian Serie A2.

Career statistics

Euroleague 

|-
| style="text-align:left;"| 2002–03
| style="text-align:left;"| Virtus Bologna
| 2 || 0 || 3.30 || 0.0 || 0.0 || 0.0 || 0.5 || 0.0 || 0.0 || 0.0 || 0 || -1
|-
| style="text-align:left;"| 2003–04
| style="text-align:left;"| Montepaschi Siena
| 2 || 0 || 2.15 || 0.0 || 100.0 || 0.0 || 0.0 || 0.0 || 0.0 || 0.0 || 1,5 || -1
|-
| style="text-align:left;"| 2008–09
| style="text-align:left;"| AJ Milano 
| 13 || 8 || 24.19 || 44.8 || 44.4 || 91.4 || 1.4 || 2.3 || 0.6 || 0.0 || 10.9 || 8
|-
| style="text-align:left;"| 2009–10
| style="text-align:left;"| Lottomatica Roma
| 6 || 1 || 19.55 || 33.3 || 29.4 || 100.0 || 1.0 || 1.0 || 0.2 || 0.2 || 5.2 || 1
|-
| style="text-align:left;"| 2010–11
| style="text-align:left;"| Lottomatica Roma
| 10 || 0 || 19.08 || 38.9 || 40.0 || 63.6 || 1.8 || 1.6 || 0.9 || 0 || 6 || 4.7
|- class="sortbottom"
| style="text-align:left;"| Career
| style="text-align:left;"|
| 33 || 9 || 13.65 || 23.4 || 42.32 || 51.0 || 0.94 || 0.98 || 0.34 || 0.04 || 4.72 || 2.34

International career
After a period with the under-age Italian team, Vitali joined the senior national team from 2007.

He was regularly called up from there on but remained a fringe player, part of Italy's FIBA EuroBasket 2013 squad, he played sparingly. He started commanding more game time in EuroBasket 2015 qualification that saw Italy qualify for the tournament.
He was called up to the preliminary squad for EuroBasket 2015, but was injured during the tournament preparation and had to leave the team before the main tournament.

Personal life
He comes from a basketball family as his brother is fellow player Michele Vitali with whom he played one season for Virtus Bologna and presently for the Italian national basketball team, their parents were also players.

References

1986 births
Living people
2019 FIBA Basketball World Cup players
Basket Brescia Leonessa players
CB Gran Canaria players
Italian expatriate basketball people in Spain
Italian men's basketball players
Lega Basket Serie A players
Liga ACB players
Mens Sana Basket players
Olimpia Milano players
Pallacanestro Virtus Roma players
Sportspeople from the Metropolitan City of Bologna
Point guards
Reyer Venezia players
Sutor Basket Montegranaro players
Vanoli Cremona players
Virtus Bologna players
Napoli Basket players